Via Sant'Andrea is a luxury shopping street in Milan, Italy, forming part of the quadrilatero della moda, along with Via Montenapoleone, Via della Spiga, Via Manzoni and Corso Venezia.

Shops
Alba Eloisa d'Alessandro
Antonio Fusco
Ballantyne
Casadei
Cesare Paciotti
Cesare Paciotti Woman
Cesare Paciotti 4US
Chanel
Chanel Joaillerie
Church's
Costume National
Damiani (jewelry company)
Fendi
Gianfranco Ferré Man
Gianfranco Ferré Woman
Giorgio Armani
Givenchy
Hermès
Kenzo
Lorenzo Banfi
Michael Kors
Missoni
Miu Miu
Moschino
Roger Vivier
Trussardi Man
Trussardi Woman
Viktor & Rolf

External links
 The Sartorialist On the Street…Via Sant’ Andrea, Milan

Shopping districts and streets in Italy
Streets in Milan
Odonyms referring to religion